Palau National Olympic Committee (IOC code: PLW) is the National Olympic Committee representing Palau.

See also
 Palau at the Olympics

References 

Palau